Lassan is a town in the Vorpommern-Greifswald district, in Mecklenburg-Western Pomerania, Germany.

Etymology
The name possibly derives from an Old Polabian word, Lěšane, meaning "forest dweller" or "forest dwelling".

Location

The town is situated on the Peenestrom river, a branch of the Oder, between the larger towns of Anklam and Wolgast. Part of the municipality are also the villages of Pulow, Papendorf, Klein Jasedow and Waschow.

Lassan has a small marina for sailboats and yachts.  There is also a campsite for visitors in the town. A museum dedicated to the town is housed in a former watermill in the town.

History
Lassan was mentioned in written sources for the first time in 1136, when it was a German settlement with a castle. However this settlement was predated by a Polabian fishing village with a fortification. The Dukes of Pomerania regulated the layout of the town around 1200. Lassan received town privileges in 1274. The town still retains much of its medieval character, with the old street grid and the remains of a town wall. The town church, St. Johannis zu Lassan, is also medieval. Construction started around 1300 and the oldest parts are in a transitional style between Romanesque and Gothic. The church was renovated during the 1990s.

Notable people
 Bernt Notke (c. 1440 – c. 1509), late Gothic artist
 Johann Joachim Spalding (1714 – 1804), Protestant theologian and philosopher, living and working as pastor in Lassan from 1749 to 1757
 Balzer Peter Vahl (1718 – 1792), merchant and mayor of Greifswald
 Theodor Bartus (1858 – 1941), sailor, museum technician, and conservator

External links 
 Lassan.eu
 Lassaner-Winkel.de
 Lassaner Türen (The Doors of Lassan)

References

Vorpommern-Greifswald
Populated places established in the 13th century
1274 establishments in Europe